Amin Mekki Medani (2 February 1939 – 31 August 2018) (Arabic: د. ٱمين مكي مدني) was a Sudanese lawyer, diplomat, human rights and political activist. He was the president of the Confederation of Sudanese Civil Society, Vice President of Civil Society Initiative, and President of the Sudan Human Rights Monitor (SHRM).  He served as head of the Office of the High Commissioner for Human Rights (OHCHR) office in the West Bank and Gaza, Chief of Mission of the OHCHR in Zagreb, Croatia, legal advisor to the Special Representative of the U.N Secretary-General in Iraq as well as Afghanistan, and a Regional Representative for the OHCHR in Beirut, Lebanon. He was the 1991 recipient of the Human Rights Watch Award for Human Rights Monitoring and 1991 Recipient of the American Bar Association Human Rights Award, as well as the 2013 recipient for the European Union Human Rights award.

Early life 
Born in 1939 in Wad Madani, Al Jazeera, Anglo-Egyptian Sudan, Medani came from a privileged background. His father had been the first Sudanese Undersecretary  of the Ministry of Irrigation, as well as a member of the Umma Party, and his mother was a relative of former ruler of Sudan, Abdallahi ibn Muhammad. He is also a distant cousin of both Sudanese artist Ibrahim El-Salahi, and Sovereign Council Member Aisha Musa el-Said.

Education 
After graduating from the prestigious Hantoub secondary school, Medani studied law at the University of Khartoum, obtaining his LL.B. with (Honours). Then in 1964, he received his Dipl. Civ.L. (Civil Law) from the University of Luxembourg. Then went on to receive a masters (LLM) with distinction at the University of London in 1965, and finally in 1970, he received a PhD in Comparative Criminal Law from the University of Edinburgh.

Career 
In 1962 after obtaining his LLB, he started working as a magistrate in the Judiciary of Sudan. In 1966, upon his return from London after completing his first post-graduate degree, he joined the faculty of law at Khartoum University, as a Senior Scholar and Lecturer until 1971. After this, he became the Acting Representative of the United Nations High Commissioner for Refugees in Tanzania, and continued working for international institutions, later on becoming one of the first black Attorneys at the World Bank in Washington DC. In 1976, having returned to Khartoum, Medani started working at the Arab Bank for Economic Development in Africa, in this time he also became more involved in activism to promote democratic governance, human rights, and the rule of law in Sudan. Following the 1985 popular people's uprising that overthrew the Nimeiry dictatorship, he served in the Transitional Government of Sudan as Cabinet Minister for Labour, Social Affairs, Peace, and Administrative Development, until the democratic election of former Prime Minister Sadiq al-Mahdi. In 1991, Medani was arrested following the coup d'etat that brought Omar al-Bashir to power, and subsequently expelled from Sudan by the government, causing him to migrate to Cairo and work at the Egyptian Bar Association.

Medani previously served as head of the Office of the High Commissioner for Human Rights (OHCHR) office in the West Bank and Gaza, Chief of Mission of the OHCHR in Zagreb, Croatia, legal advisor to the Special Representative of the U.N Secretary-General in Iraq as well as Afghanistan, and a Regional Representative for the OHCHR in Beirut, Lebanon. During his tenure in Baghdad, Medani witnessed and was injured in the Canal Hotel bombing that killed former United Nations Commissioner for Human Rights and Special Representative to Iraq, Sérgio Vieira de Mello.

Elkarib & Medani 
Amin Mekki Medani established his law firm in 1978 along with Mr. Eltigani Elkarib, and the law firm is now the most successful in the country. Some of its clients include the US Embassy, the British Embassy, French Embassy, Canadian Embassy, and the Bank of Khartoum

“The Sudan Call”
In December 2014, after returning from the signing of the Sudan Call held in Addis Ababa,  Medani, who had signed the document as President of the Civil Society Initiative was arrested, along with Farouk Abu Eissa, Chairman of the National Consensus Forces, and others when a large number of personnel from the Sudanese National Intelligence and Security Services (NISS) agents, arrived at his home in Khartoum just before midnight on Saturday, 6 December.  Although his family was not informed of the reasons for the arrest, it is believed he was arrested for signing, the Sudan Call, a statement signed by representatives from political and armed opposition parties across the country, to work towards the ending of the conflicts in Sudan in Darfur, South Kordofan and Blue Nile and build a foundation for a lasting democracy based on equal citizenship and comprehensive peace. He had been held incommunicado in an unknown location until the 21st of December, 2014, when  Medani was transferred to Kober Prison in Khartoum.  On the 22nd of December, Medani was finally permitted to meet with his lawyers and two days later with his family.  On January 10, 2015 he was charged under Article 50 (undermining the constitutional system) and Article 51 (waging war against the state) in the 1991 Criminal Code.  His trial before a special court created under the 1991 anti-terror law started on February 23. He was released five months later on April 9, 2015.

Death 
On August 31, 2018, after being denied permission to leave the country by the government and suffering from a long battle with heart disease and kidney failure, Medani died. His death was mourned as a loss for the fight for human rights and democracy. The US, British, French, and Canadian governments, as well as various other international and regional bodies and public figures published statements mourning his loss.

Amin Mekki Medani Foundation 
In 2018, shortly after the death of Medani, the Amin Mekki Medani Foundation was founded. The foundation focuses on the supporting activists and encouraging the pursuit of human rights, civil and political liberties, fighting for democracy, and many other issues. The foundation is supported by many international organizations and governments in hoping to help spread the realization of justice in Sudan.

References 

1939 births
2018 deaths
Alumni of the University of Edinburgh
Alumni of the University of London
Sudanese human rights activists
Sudanese lawyers
Sudanese politicians
University of Khartoum alumni
Academic staff of the University of Khartoum
University of Luxembourg alumni